Oleh Volodymyrovych Kuznetsov (born as Oleg Wladimirowitsch Kuznetsow in Germany) (born 22 March 1963) is a Ukrainian football coach and former professional player. He won domestic honours in the Soviet Union with Dynamo Kyiv (as well as the UEFA Cup Winners Cup in 1986), in Scotland with Rangers, in Israel with Maccabi Haifa and in Ukraine with CSKA-Borysfen Kyiv. Kuznetsov won 58 caps for the USSR national team between 1986 and 1991, playing in the final of UEFA Euro 1988 then was also selected for its successors, the CIS (five caps) and Ukraine (three caps).

Club career

Desna Chernihiv
Kuznetsov was born in Magdeburg, East Germany into a military family stationed in East Germany. His family returned to their native Ukraine and the town of Chernihiv when his father retired from the army and got a job as an engineer at a local radio plant. His mother worked as an engineer in a construction and design institute, from where she retired. Kuznetsov started playing when he was eight years old with local football schools before signing for the city's professional club Desna Chernihiv in 1980, continuing to improve his technique and tactics under the guidance of coach Efim Shkolnikov. He made 86 appearances for Desna and helped the team to finish twelfth in the Soviet Second League (Zone 5) in the 1981 season, improving to second place in the 1982 season (Zone 6).

Dynamo Kyiv
After a successful 1982 season, Kuznetsov moved to Dynamo Kyiv where he remained until September 1990. He won the Soviet Top League in 1985, 1986 and 1990, the Soviet Cup in 1985, 1987 and 1990, and the UEFA Cup Winners' Cup in 1985–86. He became regarded as one of the best defenders in Europe in the second half of the 1980s,known for his strong ball-winning skills and long-range shooting power.

Rangers
Kuznetsov transferred to Scottish club Rangers in 1990. He injured his cruciate ligament in his second game (against St Johnstone) and did not play again for a full year. New defensive players were brought in during his layoff such as Dave McPherson, and he was never a first choice again. A year after his arrival another Ukrainian, his former Dynamo Kyiv teammate Oleksiy Mykhaylychenko, joined the club, but they only played in 20 matches together across three seasons. He moved on in 1994 after a four-year stint badly hampered by injuries, with Basile Boli coming to Glasgow to take his place in the squad.

Maccabi Haifa
After being released by Rangers, Kuznetsov played for one season in Israel with Maccabi Haifa, winning the 1994–95 Israel State Cup and finishing runners-up in the 1994–95 Liga Leumit.

CSKA-Borysfen Kyiv
Kuznetsov returned to Ukraine to finish his career with CSKA-Borysfen Kyiv. In 1995–96 he won the Ukrainian Second League to achieve promotion to the Ukrainian First League.

International career
Kuznetsov played for the  East Germany U20 national team in the 1986 FIFA World Cup qualification in 1983.

He appeared in 58 games for the USSR national team (one goal), five times for the interim CIS after the fall of the Soviet Union and three times for the independent Ukraine side. He claimed a silver medal with the USSR at Euro 1988,and also appeared for them at the 1986 and 1990 FIFA World Cups; On 9 September 1990, he scored his only goal for the USSR in a 2–0 win against Norway in UEFA Euro 1992 qualifying at the Central Lenin Stadium in Moscow; subsequently he played for the CIS at Euro 1992 Finals.

Coaching career
Kuznetsov began coaching in 1998 at the last club he played for professionally, CSKA Kyiv. Starting out as an assistant coach, he became head coach for the 2001–2002 season (with CSKA Kyiv becoming Arsenal Kyiv in the meantime).

He moved to the coaching staff at Dynamo Kyiv and later had several roles with the Ukraine national team, including as a member of the staff with the senior squad that reached the quarter-finals of the 2006 FIFA World Cup in Germany, and taking charge of various youth age group teams over the next decade.

Career statistics

Club

Honours

Player
FC Desna Chernihiv
Championship of the Ukrainian SSR: Runner-up 1982

Dynamo Kyiv
UEFA Cup Winners' Cup: 1985–86
Soviet Top League: 1985, 1986, 1990
Soviet Cup: 1985, 1987, 1990

Rangers
Scottish Premier Division: 1990–91, 1991–92, 1992–93, 1993–94
Scottish League Cup: 1990–91, 1992–93, 1993–94
Scottish Cup: 1991–92

CSKA Kyiv
 Ukrainian Second League: 1995–96

Soviet Union
European Football Championship: Runner-up 1988

Individual
Ballon d'Or
1988 – 11th
1989 – 17th

References

1963 births
Living people
Sportspeople from Magdeburg
Soviet footballers
Ukrainian footballers
Footballers from Saxony-Anhalt
Association football defenders
Soviet Union international footballers
Ukraine international footballers
Dual internationalists (football)
FC Desna Chernihiv players
FC Dynamo Kyiv players
FC Arsenal Kyiv players
Rangers F.C. players
Maccabi Haifa F.C. players
Soviet Top League players
Scottish Football League players
1986 FIFA World Cup players
UEFA Euro 1988 players
1990 FIFA World Cup players
UEFA Euro 1992 players
Ukrainian football managers
FC Arsenal Kyiv managers
Soviet expatriate footballers
Ukrainian expatriate footballers
Soviet expatriate sportspeople in Scotland
Ukrainian expatriate sportspeople in Scotland
Expatriate footballers in Scotland
Ukrainian expatriate sportspeople in Israel 
Expatriate footballers in Israel
Ukrainian expatriate sportspeople in Russia
Expatriate footballers in Russia
Recipients of the Order of Merit (Ukraine), 1st class
Recipients of the Order of Merit (Ukraine), 2nd class
Recipients of the Order of Merit (Ukraine), 3rd class